Arkwright is an unincorporated area and census-designated place (CDP) adjacent to the city of Spartanburg in Spartanburg County, South Carolina, United States. It was first listed as a CDP prior to the 2020 census with a population of 2,311.

The CDP is in central Spartanburg County and is bordered to the north and west by the city of Spartanburg. It is bordered to the south by unincorporated Roebuck. The CDP takes its name from the Arkwright neighborhood of Spartanburg, directly to the north.

U.S. Route 221 is the main road through the community, leading north  to the center of Spartanburg and southwest  to Woodruff.

Demographics

2020 census

Note: the US Census treats Hispanic/Latino as an ethnic category. This table excludes Latinos from the racial categories and assigns them to a separate category. Hispanics/Latinos can be of any race.

References 

Census-designated places in Spartanburg County, South Carolina
Census-designated places in South Carolina